Domenico Gaffaro (died 1371) was a Roman Catholic prelate who served as Bishop of Asolo (1348–1371).

Biography
On 5 November 1348, he was appointed during the papacy of Pope Gregory XIII as Bishop of Asolo. He served as Bishop of Asolo until his death in 1371. While bishop, he was the principal consecrator of Lodovico Morosini, Bishop of Capodistria (1365).

References 

14th-century Italian Roman Catholic bishops
Bishops appointed by Pope Clement VI
1371 deaths